Love Guaranteed (Traditional Chinese: 愛情全保) is a TVB modern drama series broadcast in July 2006.

Cast

Viewership ratings

References

External links
TVB.com Love Guaranteed - Official Website 

TVB dramas
2006 Hong Kong television series debuts
2006 Hong Kong television series endings